Văn Thị Thanh (born 27 August 1985) is a Vietnamese football manager and former player who played as a midfielder. She has been a member of the Vietnam women's national team.

Club career
Văn Thị Thanh has played for Phong Phú Hà Nam WFC in Vietnam.

International career
Văn Thị Thanh made her senior debut for Vietnam in 2003. She capped during two AFC Women's Asian Cup qualifications (2008 and 2010).

International goals
Scores and results list Vietnam's goal tally first

Awards
Vietnamese Golden Ball
Golden Ball Female (2003)
Silver Ball Female (2005)

References

1985 births
Living people
People from Hà Nam Province
Vietnamese women's footballers
Women's association football midfielders
Vietnam women's international footballers
Vietnamese football managers
Female association football managers
Women's association football managers
Footballers at the 2006 Asian Games
21st-century Vietnamese women